Zarrin Bagh (also Romanized as Zarrīn Bāgh; also known as Zarrīnī) is a village in Khezel-e Sharqi Rural District, Khezel District, Nahavand County, Hamadan Province, Iran. At the 2006 census, its population was 267, in 59 families.

References 

Populated places in Nahavand County